Europe spans seven primary time zones (from UTC−01:00 to UTC+05:00), excluding summer time offsets (four of them can be seen on the map, with one further-western zone containing the Azores, and two further-eastern zones spanning Georgia, Azerbaijan, eastern territories of European Russia, and the European part of Kazakhstan). Most European countries use summer time and harmonise their summer time adjustments; see Summer time in Europe for details.

The time zones actually in use in Europe differ significantly from uniform zoning based purely on longitude, as used for example under the nautical time system. The world could in theory be divided into 24 time zones, each of 15 degrees of longitude. However, due to geographical and cultural factors it is not practical to divide the world so evenly, and actual time zones may differ significantly from those based purely on longitude. In Europe, the widespread use of Central European Time (CET) causes major variations in some areas from solar time. Based on solar time, CET would range from 7.5 to 22.5°E. However, for example Spain (almost entirely in the Western hemisphere) and France (almost entirely west of 7.5°E, as illustrated in the map below) should theoretically use UTC, as they did before the Second World War. The general result is a solar noon which is much later than clock noon, and later sunrises and sunsets than should theoretically happen. The Benelux countries should also theoretically use GMT.

Russia and Belarus observed "permanent summer time" between March 2011 and October 2014. Since October 2014 Russia has observed "permanent winter time". Iceland can be considered to be on "de facto" permanent summer time because, since 1968, it uses UTC time all year, despite being located more than 15° west of the prime meridian. It should therefore be located in UTC−01:00, but chooses to remain closer to continental European time, resulting in legal times significantly in advance of local solar time; this is of little practical significance owing to the wide variations in daylight hours in that country.

The European Commission proposed in September 2018 ending the observance of summer time in the EU. In March 2019, the European Parliament voted in favour of proposing ending seasonal clock changes in 2021. Legislation of the EU is decided by both the Parliament and the Council of the European Union, and the  had not made its decision. Each Member State had until April 2020 to decide whether to remain permanently on their previous "summer time" or their "winter time".

Use

Of the 27 EU member states (all use daylight saving time in the summer):
The Azores (Portugal) observe Azores Time.
Ireland, Portugal (except Azores), and the Canary Islands (Spain) use Western European Time.
Austria, Belgium, Croatia, Czech Republic, Denmark, France (except overseas territories), Germany, Hungary, Italy, Luxembourg, Malta, Netherlands, Poland, Slovakia, Slovenia, Spain (except Canary Islands) and Sweden use Central European Time.
Finland, Estonia, Latvia, Lithuania, Romania, Bulgaria, Greece and Cyprus use  Eastern European Time 
Of non-EU member states:
The United Kingdom and the Faroe Islands observe Western European Time with daylight saving time, while Iceland observes it without daylight saving time.
Norway, Switzerland, Bosnia and Herzegovina, Serbia, Kosovo, North Macedonia, Montenegro, Albania, San Marino, Vatican City, Andorra, Monaco, Liechtenstein, and Gibraltar (a British Overseas Territory) observe Central European Time with daylight saving time.
Moldova, Transnistria, Ukraine (apart from Crimea) and Northern Cyprus observe Eastern European Time with daylight saving time, while Kaliningrad Oblast observes it without daylight saving time (Kaliningrad Time).
Belarus, Russia (western part, including Crimea), South Ossetia, Abkhazia and Turkey use Further-eastern European Time without daylight saving time in the summer.
Georgia, Armenia, Azerbaijan and Artsakh use UTC+04:00 without daylight saving time.
The European part of Kazakhstan uses UTC+05:00 without daylight saving time.
The overseas territories of Denmark, France, and Netherlands are mostly located outside Europe and use other time zones.

List of time zones

References

 
Europe